Fylleån is a river in Sweden.

References

Rivers of Halland County
Rivers of Kronoberg County
Ramsar sites in Sweden